The 1998 Women's National Invitation Tournament was a single-elimination tournament of 16 NCAA Division I teams that were not selected to participate in the 1998 Women's NCAA tournament. It was the first edition of the postseason Women's National Invitation Tournament (WNIT).

The final four of the tournament paired Penn State against Indiana and Baylor against LSU. It was Penn State and Indiana third game of the year, Penn State won the rubber match 70–42 while Baylor beat LSU 66–61.

Bracket
Visiting teams in first round are listed first. Games marked signify overtime. Source

Regional bracket

Regional bracket

Championship

WNIT All-Tournament Team
Helen Darling - Penn State (MVP)
LaToya Ellis - Baylor

References

Women's National Invitation Tournament
Women's National Invitation Tournament